Sgt. Major Thomas Ellis (June 29, 1920 – January 2, 2018) from San Antonio, Texas, was a member of the famed group of World War II-era African-Americans known as the Tuskegee Airmen. He served in the 301st Fighter Squadron and the 332nd Fighter Group during WWII.

Early life and education
Ellis grew up in San Antonio, Texas and graduated from Wheatley High School He attended Samuel Huston College in Austin. He married his wife Janie in early 1942.

Military service

He was drafted into the Army in June 1942 and was sent to basic training in Newport News, VA and in October 1942 he was assigned to Tuskegee with the 99th Fighter Squadron. When Ellis arrived at Tuskegee Army Airfield in 1942 he was the only member 301st Fighter Squadron. In 1944 he was sent to Ramitelli Air Base in Italy with the Tuskegee Airmen 301st Fighter Squadron. He was an administrator and served under Colonel Benjamin O. Davis Jr. with the 332nd Fighter Group’s transfer to Taranto Italy. He achieved the rank of Sergeant Major and earned seven battle stars. He was discharged in September, 1945.

Later life
When he returned from the war he worked as a USPS mail carrier until his retirement in 1984. He died of a stroke January 2, 2018 and was buried at Fort Sam Houston National Cemetery.

Awards
Congressional Gold Medal awarded to the Tuskegee Airmen in 2006
Battle Stars (7)

See also
 Executive Order 9981
 List of Tuskegee Airmen
 Military history of African Americans

Further reading
The Tuskegee Airmen: An Illustrated History, 1939-1949

References

Notes

External links
 Tuskegee Airmen at Tuskegee University
 Tuskegee Airmen Archives at the University of California, Riverside Libraries.
 Tuskegee Airmen, Inc.
 Tuskegee Airmen National Historic Site (U.S. National Park Service) 
 Tuskegee Airmen National Museum
 Fly (2009 play about the 332d Fighter Group)

1920 births
2018 deaths
Tuskegee Airmen
African-American aviators
Congressional Gold Medal recipients
21st-century African-American people